Buteh Gaz may refer to:
 Buteh Gaz, Mashhad
 Buteh Gaz, Torbat-e Jam